This is a list of characters in the trilogy of fantasy novels by Lev Grossman begun by The Magicians and continued by The Magician King and The Magician's Land.

Main characters

Brakebills students 
 Quentin Makepeace Coldwater is the protagonist of the trilogy.  At the start, he is 17, obsessed with a series of children's books called "Fillory and Further", and depressed.  After a successful interview, he moves to Brakebills to study magic.  After his graduation from Brakebills, Penny brings him evidence of travel between worlds and he travels to Fillory.  Following a confrontation with the Beast in which he is seriously injured, he spends 6 months unconscious being healed by centaurs.  He returns to Earth, taking a non-magical job before Eliot, Janet, and Julia arrive and he goes with them to rule Fillory.  As a King of Fillory, he travels to the outer islands to collect unpaid taxes and is accidentally returned to Earth.  After returning to Fillory and helping Eliot finish a quest to return magic to Fillory, he is again ejected from Fillory.  Back on Earth, he returns to Brakebills, is assigned the Discipline of Minor Mendings, and becomes a professor until, after a prank by Plum, a Brakebills student, goes wrong, he is fired.  He accepts a job attempting to steal a suitcase from a pair of magicians, and begins working with Plum.  In the aftermath of the heist, he moves to New York with Plum, and they try to use the contents of the briefcase to create a magical land.  Missing a key ingredient, they fail.  Following Eliot to Fillory, which is now almost dead, he sacrifices Ember and Umber, gains their power, and repairs the land.  He returns to New York, and is then successful in creating a magical land, which he begins to explore.  In an interview, Grossman describes Quentin at the start of the trilogy as being a lot like he was as a teenager and "at the very end of the books gets to somewhere around where I'm trying to be".  Quentin is at least somewhat bisexual, as though he prefers women, he was open to sleeping with Eliot.
 Julia Wicker is a childhood friend of Quentin's.  Following an unsuccessful interview for Brakebills on the same day as Quentin, she works to learn magic from other sources.  Eventually, she finds Free Trader Beowulf, a group of hedge witches like herself, and she moves to Murs in France to study with them.  Following an accidental summoning of Reynard, the trickster god, in which she is raped and has her humanity taken, she finds Eliot and Janet and travels with them and Quentin to become a Queen of Fillory.  During a quest to restore magic to Fillory, the goddess she had intended to summon makes her a dryad, and she becomes a demigod, after which she goes to look after the other side of Fillory.  Grossman has stated that she is very like what he was like in his twenties, when he "really got lost in the way that she does", and in writings about his own struggles with depression has used similar phrasing to the way he describes her.
 Alice Quinn is a friend and lover of Quentin's and an extremely talented magician.  She is in Quentin's class at Brakebills, moves up a year with him, and is sorted into the Physical magic group by her Discipline, which is Phosphoromancy.  She comes from a family of magicians; her older brother was at Brakebills 8 years before her, and died when he was transformed into a niffin, a spirit of pure magic, by a spell that got out of control.  At first, she is painfully shy, and is "deep in a trance of unworthiness", but she is able to pull herself out of it.  After Brakebills, she and Quentin fall into a hedonistic lifestyle until they travel to Fillory.  She transforms herself into a niffin to be able to defeat the Beast, saving her friends and Ember in the process.  As a niffin, she explores Fillory, travelling in time back to its beginning, before making her way back to Earth and to Brakebills.  There, seeing Plum and Quentin, she follows them until Quentin traps her in a failed attempt at making a magical land, and is able to transform her back into a human.  She travels to Fillory with him as the land is dying, and assists him in the process of repairing it, before returning to New York.  There, she and Quentin succeed in making a magical land and set out to explore it.
 Eliot Waugh is a friend of Quentin's who becomes the High King of Fillory.  He comes from Oregon, where he was bullied for his sexuality.  Two years older than Quentin, Eliot welcomes him when he takes his entrance exam.  Eliot is described by Quentin as "conspicuously brilliant" despite never seeming to study.  He takes great care in his appearance, is a heavy drinker with an appreciation for fine wines, and smokes.  He travels to Fillory with Quentin, and then becomes its High King, where he is able to develop into a mature and caring individual.  In an interview, Grossman stated that Eliot was based on several people, including a college roommate that he looked up to.
 Janet is a peer of Eliot and Josh, was in the Physical magic group, and becomes High Queen of Fillory.  She is called "Janet Way" by another student in the first book, but "Janet Pluchinsky" by Dean Fogg in the second.  She is outspoken and sometimes unkind, but fiercely loyal.  She travels with the others to Fillory, where she becomes High Queen.  During Eliot's absence, she tours the lands and writes a constitution.  Her discipline involves cold magic, and in the third book she has a pair of ice axes she calls her "Sorrows."  In an interview, Grossman describes her as being free with her anger in a way he wishes he could be and notes that she says the sorts of things he would want to.  Grossman has also noted that the discrepancy in her names is due to "operator error", in that he had forgotten that he'd revealed her last name and inadvertently renamed her.
 Josh Hoberman is a peer of Eliot and Janet and later King of Fillory.  He is the overweight comic relief of the Physical Magic group; an incredibly strong but inconsistent magician, he barely graduates from Brakebills.  After travelling to Fillory with the others, he uses one of the buttons that allows users to travel between worlds to explore the multiverse, before he sells the button to the dragon in the Grand Canal and uses the money to buy himself a mansion and set himself up as an intermediary between self-trained "hedge witches" and classically trained magicians.  He accidentally returns to Fillory with Quentin and Julia, and ends up becoming King of Fillory and marrying Poppy, with whom he has a child.
 Penny is a peer of Quentin's and later the Librarian of the Neitherlands, the city between worlds.  It is revealed that his first name is William and his middle name is Schroeder, but no last name is given.  He is examined for Brakebills on the same day as Quentin, and his Discipline involves travel between worlds.  After leading the others to Fillory and a fight with the Beast, in which his hands are bitten off, he chooses to stay in the Neitherlands.  During the fight with the Old Gods, he proves himself capable, and losses in personnel mean that he is promoted to be Librarian of the order that runs the Neitherlands.  He has spectral prostheses for his hands, which have a number of extra capabilities.  In an interview, Grossman described him as a "suburban ... punk wannabe" who grew up in an upper-middle class home; he has a sheltered life in a Southern California Gated community and "tries to cobble together a personality by pretending he doesn't".  Grossman describes him as very close in personality to Quentin, "just not in the ways that would make them like each other".

The Chatwins 
The Chatwins are a family of five siblings who travel to Fillory while being sent away to the country; their descriptions of these travels to Christopher Plover form the basis of the "Fillory and Further" novels.  They are listed in order of age.
 Martin Chatwin, also known as the Beast, is the eldest sibling and first to travel to Fillory. He features in "The World in the Walls" and appears at the end of "The Flying Forest".  Christopher Plover sexually abuses him, and he becomes disillusioned with the real world. He is able to sneak back in to Fillory through a route intended for Rupert, and he gives his humanity to Umber to be able to remain in Fillory forever. He becomes the Beast, rules Fillory as a tyrant, and is killed by Alice.
 Fiona Chatwin features in "The World in the Walls" and "The Flying Forest", and later has children who inherit the house in Cornwall. In her later life, she would pretend she'd never heard of Fillory.
 Rupert Chatwin is the author of "The Door in the Page" and the great-grandfather of Plum Purchas.  He features in "The Girl Who Told Time", "The Flying Forest", and "The Secret Sea".  He witnessed Martin giving his humanity to Umber in Castle Blackspire, after which he stole a spell and a knife capable of killing gods.  He left the spell, the knife, and a memoir called "The Door in the Page" in a briefcase that could only be opened by one of his descendants before he was killed in Africa in World War II; this memoir is included in The Magician's Land.
 Helen Chatwin features in "The Girl Who Told Time" and "The Wandering Dune".  She is described as pious, worshipping Ember and Umber and deferring to Their judgement.  After she and Jane receive magic buttons that would allow them to travel to Fillory at will, she hides them in a well.  Later, she changes her name, becomes an Evangelical Christian, and moves to Texas.
 Jane Chatwin, also known as the Watcherwoman, is the author of "The Magicians," intended to be the sixth "Fillory and Further" book.  She features in "The Wandering Dune" and "The Secret Sea".  After she finds the magic buttons again at around age 13, she returns to Fillory to be told Martin has become the Beast and that Umber has been killed.  She holds a war council with Ember.  The dwarves give her a watch that allows her to travel in time, and she attempts many different scenarios until Quentin and his friends are finally able to kill the Beast, after which she destroys the watch.  Following this, she ages rapidly.  Posing as a paramedic, she is responsible for giving Quentin the note that leads him to his Brakebills entrance exam.

Ember and Umber 
Ember and Umber, also known as the Great Rams, are the dual ram gods of Fillory, somewhat analogous to Aslan in their role.  Each is significantly larger than a normal ram, with large, curled horns.  Ember is golden, and has a resonant baritone voice, whereas Umber is dark grey, also known as the Shadow Ram, and has a higher, tenor voice.

In the "Fillory and Further" books, they generally gave the Chatwin children a quest at the beginning, and then returned at the end to send them home again.  In The Magicians, Ember has been trapped by the Beast, and Umber is presumed dead.  It later emerges that the Beast was created when Martin Chatwin gave his humanity to Umber, who wanted to be a King as well as a god.

Characters introduced in The Magicians

Brakebills

Students 
 Amanda Orloff - student at Brakebills and peer of Quentin after he moves up a year.  She is described as "devastatingly competent" and is the daughter of a Five-star general.  She is killed when she tries to fight against the Beast after he breaks into Brakebills.
 Gretchen - student at Brakebills a year older than Quentin who walks with a limp.
 Surendra - student at Brakebills the same age as Quentin.

Faculty 
 Henry Fogg - the Dean of Brakebills.  Fogg makes Quentin his offer at his interview, and remains a presence throughout the books.
 Melanie Van der Weghe - Professor Van der Weghe tutors Penny on his independent study project.
 Pearl Sunderland - Professor Sunderland tutors Quentin when he is attempting to move up a year, and tests students for their Disciplines.  In Quentin's first year at Brakebills, she is 25, and he has a crush on her.
 Mayakovsky - Professor Mayakovsky runs Brakebills South, in Antarctica.  Despite being married, he had an affair with Emily Greenstreet, after which he was sent to Brakebills South, where he is held by an Incorporate Bond.  He is an excellent magician, and has, in his spare time, constructed many magical wonders, any of which might have been a magnum opus.  His father was brought in from Siberia to be a professor at Brakebills.  His power-storing coins are used by Quentin to restore Alice, among other tasks.
 March - Professor of Practical Applications.  After Quentin distracts him in class, he misspeaks, allowing the Beast to enter; after these events, he retires.
 Chambers - the Butler of Brakebills.  After Eliot catches him taking wine from the Dean's cellar, he buys cigarettes for Eliot.  He also provides the Physical Kids with alcohol.
 Bigby - the mentor of the Physical Kids and a Pixie.
 Brzezinski - a potions expert.
 Foxtree - a tall, Native American professor who officiates a game of welters.

Fillorians 
 Humbledrum - bear.
 Farvel - birch tree.
 Dint - guide to the group who betrays them to the Beast.
 Fen - guide to the group who is killed in Ember's Tomb.
 The Questing Beast - one of the 12 unique beasts of Fillory.  Quentin tracks the beast, and it grants his wish to go home to Earth.

Others 
 Alice's Parents
 James - Quentin's best friend back in Brooklyn.  He goes to university, becomes a hedge fund manager, lives in Hoboken, and Julia foresees that he will die in a skiing accident at age 77.
 Richard - physical magician a year above Eliot, Janet, and Josh at Brakebills.  He travels with the group to Fillory.
 Anaïs - magician from Luxembourg who travels to Fillory with Quentin and his friends.
 Emily Greenstreet - was a student at Brakebills in the same year as Charlie, Alice's older brother, 8 years before Quentin.  She had an affair with Professor Mayakovsky, leading to his exile to Brakebills South, and was somewhat responsible for Charlie's death.  She accepts a high paying job in New York essentially doing nothing, and meets Quentin after he returns from Fillory.
 Lovelady - a travelling purveyor of questionably magical items who occasionally visits Brakebills.  He sells a magical button to Penny allowing travel between worlds.

Characters introduced in The Magician King

Fillorians 
 Abigail the Sloth - representative of the talking animals, sent aboard the Muntjac. She also acts as a psychopomp who provides the method by which Quentin and Julia reach the Underworld.  
 Aral - second place finisher in the Fillory-wide swordsman competition.
 Admiral Lacker - Admiral of the Fillory Navy and Captain of the Muntjac.
 Benedict Fenwick - apprentice in the map room in Castle Whitespire. Quentin convinces him to come aboard the Muntjac to help with maps and make new ones on their voyage. He is killed as he is leaving the Muntjac during a battle. 
 Bingle - winner of the Fillory-wide swordsman competition and personal bodyguard to Quentin and Julia.
 Elaine - customs agent of Fillory, she tends to the borders. She is the daughter of the man who collected the keys, and Eleanor is her daughter. Quentin first meets her on Outer Island, and then at the End of the World.
 Eleanor - daughter of Elaine. She makes Quentin a passport on Outer Island.
 Jollyby - master of the hunt at Castle Whitespire.
 unnamed collector of keys - father of Elaine

Julia's acquaintances 
Julia's family consists of two parents and a sister four years younger than her.

The safe houses 
 Jared - leader of the first safe house Julia finds.  He travels with her when she explores other safe houses, looking for information.
 Warren - leader of a safe house in Richmond, Virginia, and a wood spirit of some kind.  When he gets upset, he loses control of his human disguise and begins to sprout branches.

Free Trader Beowulf 
Free Trader Beowulf is an online support group for people with serious clinical depression. Julia joins them after passing a series of hidden tests and decoding messages found online. There are 14 members; she is the 15th. Later, when she learns magic, she joins some of them in Murs, in a house owned by Pouncy, where they are attempting to gain more magical strength by summoning a god. The name "Free Trader Beowulf" is a reference to the early role-playing game Traveller.

 Asmodeus - approximately 17, with a mysterious past and a brilliant mind for theoretical physics.  She is the only one of the Murs magicians to survive.  In The Magician's Land, she goes by the name of Betsy, and is involved in the heist.  She eventually kills Reynard.
 Failstaff - member of the Murs magicians.  About 30, he is 6'5" and "built like a butte".  He is in love with Asmodeus
 Pouncy Silverkitten - owner of the house in Murs.  He made a fortune trading stocks, and holds the Free Trader Beowulf record for highest level of prescriptions.  He is described as looking like an Abercrombie model.
 Gummidgy - member of the Murs magicians who acts as high priestess during the attempted summoning of Our Lady Underground and who is a psychic.
 Fiberpunk - member of the Murs magicians who specialises in metamagic, magic that acts on other magic.  He is described as a "short, thickset specimen almost as wide as he was tall."
 Iris - member of the Murs magicians who finds Julia in a safe house and tests her.  Once Julia moves to Murs, Iris teaches her the rest of the basics so that Julia can participate in the rest of their research.

Others 
 Reynard the Fox - trickster god that the Murs magicians accidentally summon instead of Our Lady Underground. He kills everybody except for Julia and Asmodeus.  After Julia sacrifices her shade to him, he rapes her, giving her semi-divine power.
 Our Lady Underground - old fertility goddess from Provence. She carries a staff in one hand and in the other a nest with three eggs, and half her face is always in shade to signify the half the year she spends in the underworld. She is old enough that her name has been lost, so the Murs magicians name her after a statue, Notre Dame Sous Terre, which is one of the Black Madonnas that bear her influence.
 Poppy - Australian magician and friend of Josh's who studies dragons. After being accidentally drawn into Fillory, she chooses to remain as a Queen, and eventually she and Josh are married. When the third book ends, she is pregnant with their child.
 The Venetian Dragon - lives in the Grand Canal and buys the button that allows interdimensional travel from Josh. It gives Quentin advice about how to return to Fillory and later travels to the Neitherlands to fight the old gods.
 The old gods - accidentally summoned by Free Trader Beowulf, return to end access to magic. They appear as  glowing, naked, bald, and muscled giants, and are described as being "magician[s] operating on a titanic power scale."
 Thomas - young boy living in the Chatwins' Cornwall house who helps Quentin and Julia return to Fillory.

Characters introduced in The Magician's Land

Brakebills 
 Plum Polson Purchas -great-granddaughter of Rupert Chatwin, a student at Brakebills, a friend of Quentin's, and a point-of-view character.  At Brakebills, she is the founder of The League, which comprises a group of her friends, and she is responsible for the prank that leads to Quentin's dismissal as professor.  Her discipline involves illusions, and she is recruited to assist in the heist, where she works with Quentin.  After that goes awry, she and Quentin hole up in a Brownstone in New York she bought with the money that she inherited from the profits of the "Fillory and Further" novels.  She remains in Fillory to catch up with Jane Chatwin and explore.
 Professor Hamish Bax - Chair of the botany department.  Only a few years older than Quentin, Bax is likewise not deeply friendly with the rest of the faculty, and the two become friends.
 Wharton - a fourth year Brakebills student charge of serving wine, whom Plum pranks, leading to her expulsion.
 Darcy, Emma, Chelsea, Lucy, and Holly are other members of the League, Plum's friend group.

Characters involved in the heist 
 A Blackbird organises the heist and pays the participants.  The Blackbird is one of the talking beasts from Fillory, who was sent by Ember to recover the spell contained in the briefcase.
 Lionel - golem created by the blackbird from a spell given to it by Ember to help it organise the heist.  He kills Pushkar, before being killed by Asmodeus.
 Pushkar - magician who specialises in transport and has some precognitive skills.  He is married with a family, and was trained at Brakebills.
 Stoppard - 17-year-old self-taught practitioner of horomancy, creating complicated clockwork machines that work magic. Quentin gives him his alias after seeing him reading a Tom Stoppard play.
 Betsy - alias for Asmodeus, a friend of Julia, introduced in The Magician King.

Fillorians 
 Vile Father - the champion of the Lorian army, the Vile Father fights Eliot at the end of the attempted Lorian invasion of Fillory.  He is incredibly wide yet still fast, strong, and skilled at fighting.
 The desert dwellers who live in the southern desert.  Janet spends some time with them when she journeys there to annex the desert for Fillory.
 "The Prince of the Mud," a giant snapping turtle who lives under the Northern Marshes.  Janet has encountered it before and bested it.

References

Magicians, The
Magicians, The
The Magicians series